Joshua or Josh James may refer to:

 Joshua James (cricketer) (born 2001), Trinidadian cricketer
 Joshua James (folk singer), American rock and folk musician
 Joshua James (lifesaver) (1826–1902), American sea captain; commander of civilian life-saving crews
 Josh James (born 1973), American entrepreneur, founder of Domo and co-founder of Omniture
 Josh James (baseball), baseball player
 Josh James (singer) (born 1990), English singer born James Dubovie
 Joshua James, founder of Zig Media